Trefethen is a surname. Notable people with the surname include:

Anne Trefethen, British computer scientist, former wife of Lloyd N.
Florence Newman Trefethen (1921–2012), American codebreaker, poet, and English professor, wife of Lloyd M. and mother of Lloyd N.
Lloyd M. Trefethen (1919–2001), American fluid dynamics researcher, husband of Florence and father of Lloyd N.
Lloyd N. Trefethen (born 1955), British mathematician, son of Florence and Lloyd M., former husband of Anne

See also
Trefethen Vineyards, a winery in Napa County, California, United States